Vladimir Alimdyanov (born July 7, 1973) is an Uzbekistani sprint canoer who competed in the mid-1990s. He was eliminated in the repechages of the K-2 1000 m event at the 1996 Summer Olympics in Atlanta.

External links
Sports-Reference.com profile

1973 births
Canoeists at the 1996 Summer Olympics
Living people
Olympic canoeists of Uzbekistan
Uzbekistani male canoeists